The Judean Civil War was a conflict between King Alexander Jannaeus and the Pharisees, the dominant political party in the Great Sanhedrin at the time. Alexander was supported by the minority Sadducees, while the Pharisees under Nasi Joshua ben Perachiah were briefly backed by the Seleucid Empire.

Background
The civil war began after a decade of expansionist military campaigns by Alexander, whose dual role as both King of Judea and High Priest of the Jewish Temple resulted in a dereliction of his religious responsibilities in Jerusalem, which became the root of criticism by the Pharisees. After suffering a defeat by the Arab Nabateans in the Battle of Gadara in 93 BC, Alexander returned to Jerusalem to officiate the festival of Sukkot. He demonstrated his displeasure against the Pharisees by refusing to perform the water libation ceremony properly: instead of pouring it on the altar, he poured it on his feet. The crowd responded with shock at his mockery and showed their displeasure by pelting him with etrogim (citrons). Outraged, he ordered soldiers to kill those who insulted him, which lead to the massacre of six thousand people in the Temple courtyard. With further frustration, Alexander had wooden barriers built around the temple and  the court with the sacrificial altar, to which only priests had access. This incident during the Feast of Tabernacles was a major factor leading up to the Judean Civil War by igniting popular opposition against Alexander.

War
After Alexander succeeded early in the war, the rebels relocated to Sepphoris, in the heavily pro-Pharisee region of Galilee, and appealed for Seleucid assistance. Judean insurgents joined forces with Demetrius III Eucaerus to fight against Alexander. Alexander had gathered six thousand, two hundred mercenaries and twenty thousand Jews for battle as Demetrius had forty thousand soldiers and three thousand horses. There were attempts from both sides to persuade each other to abandon positions but were unsuccessful. The Seleucid forces defeated Alexander at Shechem, and all of Alexander's mercenaries were killed in battle. This defeat forced Alexander to take refuge in the mountains. In sympathy towards Alexander, six thousand Judean rebels ultimately returned to him. In fear of this news, Demetrius withdrew. Nevertheless, war between Alexander and the rebels who returned to him continued. They fought until Alexander achieved victory. Most of the rebels died in battle, while the remaining rebels fled to the city of Bethoma until they were defeated.

Aftermath
Alexander brought the surviving rebels back to Jerusalem where he had eight hundred Jews, primarily Pharisees, crucified. Before their deaths, Alexander had the rebels' wives and children executed before their eyes as Alexander ate with his concubines. Alexander later returned the land he had seized from the Nabateans in order to have them end their support for the Jewish rebels. The remaining rebels, who numbered eight thousand, fled by night in fear of Alexander.

However, Alexander's military victory failed to translate into a political one. In 87 BC, Alexander's queen, Salome Alexandra, was the sister of deputy Pharisee leader Simeon ben Shetach, and ordered Simeon's return from exile in Egypt. In a soft coup, Simeon and Alexandra forced Alexander to relinquish most of his power, and by 80 BC the Pharisees had retaken control of the Great Sanhedrin with Simeon as Nasi (literally "President," but equivalent to modern "Prime Minister"), while the King was served mainly as head of the Judean army. Alexander Jannaeus died in 76 BC, making Salome Alexandra Queen Regnant of Judea, and assassinations of Sadducee leaders who had served in the civil war became common. These retributions would later contribute to the Hasmonean Civil War.

See also
 List of Jewish civil wars

References

Works cited
 
 

1st century BC in the Hasmonean Kingdom
90s BC conflicts
80s BC conflicts
Pharisees
Civil wars of antiquity
Civil wars involving the states and peoples of Asia
Wars involving the Seleucid Empire
Jewish military history